Fort Campbell North is a census-designated place (CDP) in Christian County, Kentucky, United States. It contains most of the housing for the Fort Campbell Army base within the Kentucky portion of the base. The population was 13,685 at the 2010 census, down from 14,338 in 2000.

Fort Campbell North is part of the Clarksville, Tennessee metropolitan area.

Geography 
Fort Campbell North is located along the southern border of Christian County at  (36.653631, -87.459716). The southern border is also the Tennessee state line, and the Kentucky city of Oak Grove lies along the CDP's eastern border, which follows Fort Campbell Boulevard (US Route 41A).

Demographics 

As of the census of 2000, there were 14,338 people, 2,842 households, and 2,768 families residing in the CDP. The racial makeup was 58.6% White, 25.8% Black or African American, 1.0% Native American, 1.7% Asian, 1.0% Pacific Islander, 7.1% from other races, and 4.8% from two or more races. Hispanics or Latinos of any race were 13.8% of the population.

There were 2,842 households, out of which 87.1% had children under the age of 18 living with them, 88.6% were married couples living together, 7.3% had a female householder with no husband present, and 2.6% were non-families. 2.4% of all households were made up of individuals, none of whom were 65 years of age or older. The average household size was 3.78 and the average family size was 3.81.

The age distribution was 35.6% under the age of 18, 31.1% from 18 to 24, 32.4% from 25 to 44, and 0.8% from 45 to 64. The median age was 21 years. For every 100 females, there were 157.6 males. For every 100 females age 18 and over, there were 205.6 males.

The median income for a household in the CDP was $26,755, and the median income for a family was $26,632. Males had a median income of $19,846 versus $18,478 for females. The per capita income for the CDP was $10,319. About 11.2% of families and 13.1% of the population were below the poverty line, including 15.9% of those under the age of 18.

Climate
The climate in this area is characterized by hot, humid summers and generally mild to cool winters.  According to the Köppen Climate Classification system, Fort Campbell North has a humid subtropical climate, abbreviated "Cfa" on climate maps.

References

Census-designated places in Christian County, Kentucky
Census-designated places in Kentucky
Clarksville metropolitan area